KYAY 91.1 FM is a Community radio station, owned and operated by the San Carlos Apache Tribe. Licensed to San Carlos, Arizona, the station serves the San Carlos Apache Indian Reservation.

See also
 List of community radio stations in the United States

References

External links
 

Community radio stations in the United States
Native American radio
YAY
Apache culture